Aurélien Bekogo Zolo (born 27 December 1975) is a Gabonese footballer who played as a forward. He made 26 appearances for the Gabon national football team from 1994 to 2000. He was also named in Gabon's squad for the 1996 African Cup of Nations tournament.

References

External links
 

1975 births
Living people
Gabonese footballers
Association football forwards
Gabon international footballers
1996 African Cup of Nations players
Sportspeople from Libreville
21st-century Gabonese people